The 1986 Delaware Fightin' Blue Hens football team represented the University of Delaware in the 1986 NCAA Division I-AA football season. It was the program's first year as a member of the Yankee Conference, after having been an independent for the previous 16 seasons. Delaware was led by Tubby Raymond, who was in his 21st season as head coach of the Fightin' Blue Hens. Quarterback Rich Gannon was a senior, and followed this season with an 18-year NFL career. The team played its home games at Delaware Stadium in Newark, Delaware.

Schedule

References

Delaware
Delaware Fightin' Blue Hens football seasons
Yankee Conference football champion seasons
Delaware Fightin' Blue Hens football